Badis badis, also known as the blue perch or blue badis, is a small species of Asian freshwater fish in the family Badidae of the order Anabantiformes. It is found in ponds, rivers, ditches and swamps in northern India, eastern Pakistan, Bangladesh, Bhutan and Nepal, including the Ganges, Brahmaputra, Mahanadi and Indus basins. It is sometimes kept as an aquarium fish. It is a small, predatory fish that feeds on tiny invertebrates. It is sexually dimorphic, with males growing larger and being more colorful, especially when excited, compared to females. Adult males have blue fins and may display dark vertical bands on the flanks, while the smaller females display little color. Several similar relatives, now recognized as separate Badis species, have historically been confused with Badis badis. Historically the two genera that now make up the Badidae, Badis and Dario, were placed in the family Nandidae; this is no longer the case.

References 

Fish of Pakistan
Badidae
Fish described in 1822